Juan Pablo Gamboa (born November 24, 1966 in Cali, Colombia) is a Colombian actor. The second of four children,Juan Pablo Gamboa Cook. was raised in a bi-cultural, bilingual household due to his mother, Sandra Cook - originally from Boston who went to Colombia with the Peace Corps and his colombian father, Andrés Gamboa Ruiz. The Gamboa family from Cali, Colombia, traces its ancestry to the Colombian poet Isaias Gamboa (1872-1904) and more than 30 poets, writers, artists and educators, spanning more than five generations. 

He appeared in telenovelas including  Esmeralda, La usurpadora, Carita de Ángel, La intrusa.

Gamboa studied communications in Hofstra University in New York. His portrayal of Willy in La usurpadora gave him his first TVyNovelas Award nomination for best male antagonist.

He has four children, Santiago and Mariana from his first wife Viviana Escobar and Juan Martin and another son with his second wife.

Filmography 
Marielena (1992) - A receptionist
Si nos dejan (1995)
Morelia - Osvaldo Valenzuela (1995)
Prisioneros del amor - Juan Felipe Sáenz de la Peña (1997)
Esmeralda - Dr. Álvaro Lazcano (1997)
La usurpadora - Guillermo 'Willy' Montero (1998)
El diario de Daniela - Pepe Linares (1999)
Alma rebelde - Alessandro Villareal (1999)
Carita de Ángel - Noé Gamboa (2000–2001)
La intrusa - Esteban Fernández (2001)
Fidel (movie about Fidel Castro) (2002) - USA Ambassador in Cuba
Vampires: Los Muertos (2002)
Niña amada mía - César Fábregas (2003)
Ángel Rebelde - Camilo Salazar (2004)
Cuando el cielo es azul (2005)
Pura sangre - Federico Lagos 
Kings of South Beach - Danny Hayes 
Vuelo 1503 - Jorge Pineda 
Súper pá - Nicolás Cortés (2008)
Las detectivas y el Víctor - Roberto Becker (2009-)
La Suegra - Dr. Domínguez (2014)
La Viuda Negra (Colombian-Mexican TV series) - Detective Norm Jones (2014-)
Ana Maria in Novela Land - as Eduardo (Romantic comedy movie) (2015)Loving Pablo (2017) from Virginia Vallejo's memoir Loving Pablo, Hating Escobar.

References

1966 births
Living people
Colombian male film actors
Colombian male telenovela actors
Colombian male television actors
Colombian people of American descent
Colombian people of British descent
Colombian expatriates in Mexico
Male actors from Cali
Colombian emigrants to the United States